The Greatest Live Show on Earth is a live album by the pianist and rock and roll pioneer Jerry Lee Lewis. It was released on Smash Records in 1964.

Recording
Lewis had already released a live album in Europe on the Philips label in 1964 - Live at the Star Club, Hamburg - but Philips was unaffiliated with Smash and, because of legal constraints, the album did not come out in the United States. The producer Shelby Singleton decided to record a live album that could be released on Smash and The Greatest Live Show on Earth was assembled mainly from shows performed at the Municipal Auditorium in Birmingham, Alabama, in front of 15,000 fans. "Shelby had microphones set up all across the stage," Lewis is quoted in Joe Bonomo's book, Jerry Lee Lewis: Lost and Found. "It was the first time anyone had set up a live recording like that. We got some real momentum goin' out there and it all had to be captured in one take.  No second chances. I think Shelby edited out some of the talking but that was all." Lewis was backed by his new touring band that soon became known as the Memphis Beats.

Track listing
"Jenny, Jenny" (Enotris Johnson, Richard Penniman)
"Who Will the Next Fool Be" (Charlie Rich)
"Memphis" (Chuck Berry)
"Hound Dog" (Jerry Leiber, Mike Stoller)
"I Got a Woman" (Ray Charles, Renald Richard)
"Hi-Heel Sneakers" (Tommy Tucker)
"No Particular Place To Go" (Chuck Berry)
"Together Again" (Buck Owens)
"Long Tall Sally" (Enotris Johnson, Richard Penniman)
"Whole Lotta Shakin' Going On" (Sunny David, Dave "Curlee" Williams)

1964 live albums
Jerry Lee Lewis albums
albums produced by Jerry Kennedy
Albums produced by Shelby Singleton
Live rockabilly albums
Smash Records albums
Rock-and-roll albums